Avtar Gill is an Indian actor who appears predominantly in Hindi and Punjabi language films and television serials. He has done many plays with Indian People's Theatre Association Mumbai.

Selected filmography

Films

 Noorie (1979)
 Albert Pinto Ko Gussa Kyoon Aata Hai (1980)
Dhan Daulat (1980)
 Saath Saath (1982)
 Ashanti as Raghu
 Sawaal (1982)
Ek Jaan Hain Hum (1983)
 Mashaal (1984) as Mohan
Zamana (1985) as Police Inspector. 
 Ghulami (1985)
 Khamosh (1986)
 Avinash (1986) as CID Inspector
 Thikana (1987) as MP Rane
Khoon Bahaa Ganga Mein (1988)
 Shahenshah (1988) as Police Commissioner
 Waaris (1988)
 Zakhmi Aurat (1988) as Rapist
 Daddy (1989)
 Ilaaka (1989) as MLA Becharam
 Main Azaad Hoon (1989)
 Awaargi (1990)
 Agneepath (1990)
 Aashiqui (1990)
 Baaghi (1990)
Nachnewale Gaanewale (1991)
 Fateh (1991)
 Jaan Ki Kasam (1991)
Karz Chukana Hai (1991)
 Dil Hai Ke Manta Nahin (1991)
 Saathi (1991)
 Pyaar Ka Saaya (1991)
 Sadak (1991)
 Lakshmanrekha (1991)
Saatwan Aasman (1992)
 Adharm (1992)
 Nishchaiy (1992)
 Jeena Marna Tere Sang (1992)
 Balwaan (1992)
Dil Hi To Hai (1992 film)
 Jaanam (1992)
 Insaniyat Ke Devta (1993)
 Aaj Kie Aurat (1993)
 Sangram (1993)
 Phir Teri Kahani Yaad Aayee (1993)
 Sir (1993)
 Chor Aur Chaand (1993)
 Pehla Nasha (1993)
 Jeevan Ki Shatranj (1993)
 Gumrah (1993 film)
 Pehchaan (1993)
 Tadipaar (1993)
 Dulaara (1994)
 Dilwale (1994)
 Imtihaan (1994)
 Jai Kishen (1994)
 Mohra (1994)    
Madam X (1994 film) Rana Deshpanday Cameo Appearance 
 Aag (1994)
 Kranti Kshetra (1994)
Hum Hain Bemisaal (1994)
 Baazi (1995)
 God And Gun (1995)
 Sabse Bada Khiladi (1995)
 Milan (1995)
 Rangeela (1995)
Veergati (1995)
 Bal Brahmachari (1996)
 Ek Tha Raja (1996)
Vishwasghaat (1996)
 Chaahat (1996)
 Bhishma (1996)
Mr.Bechara (1996)
 Sapoot (1996) as School Master Vidyasagar
 Chhote Sarkar (1996)
 Ram Aur Shyam (1996)
 Lahu Ke Do Rang (1997) as Lawyer Hasu Bhai
 Mrityudand (1997)
 Gudia (1997)
 Aur Pyaar Ho Gaya (1997)
 Deewana Mastana (1997)
 Phool Bane Patthar (1998)
 Chandaal (1998)
 Ustadon Ke Ustad (1998)
 Keemat – They Are Back (1998)
 Major Saab (1998)
 Bade Miyan Chote Miyan (1998)
 Pardesi Babu (1998)
 Zakhm (1998)
 International Khiladi (1999)
Safari (1999 film)  as Police Inspector Avatar Singh
 Baadshah (1999) as Seth Jhunjhunwala
 Dil Kya Kare (1999)
 Yeh Hai Mumbai Meri Jaan (1999)
Hadh Kar Di Aapne (2000) as Mr Bakiyani 
 Beti No.1 (2000)
 Jungle (2000)
 Jodi No.1 (2001)
 Ek Rishtaa: The Bond of Love (2001)
 Indian (2001)
Deewaanapan (2001)
 Maa Tujhhe Salaam (2002)
Hum Kisise Kum Nahin (2002) as Inspector Shinde
Encounter: The Killing (2002)
 Gunaah (2002)
 Hawa (2003)
 Tada (2003)
 Baghban (2003)
 Inteha (2003)
 LOC Kargil (2003)
 Yeh Lamhe Judaai Ke (2004)
 Lakeer – Forbidden Lines (2004)
Bhola in Bollywood (2004)
 Elaan (2005)
 Ssukh (2005)
 Tom, Dick, and Harry (2006) as Celina's Uncle
Alag (2006)
 The Killer (2006)
Sarhad Paar (2006)
 Nehlle Pe Dehlla (2007) 
 Big Brother (2007 film)..Lawyer Nathani
 Dhoondte Reh Jaaoge (2009)
Asa Mi Tasa Mi (2010) as Satish Sarpotdar (Marathi film) 
 Tees Maar Khan (2010)
 Mere Dost Picture Abhi Baki Hai (2012)
 Pinky Moge Wali (2012)
 Singh vs Kaur (2013)
 Luv U Soniyo (2013)
 Wazir (2016)
 Airlift (2016)
 Toofan Singh (2017)
 Dhingana (2017) as  Mohan Shetty (Marathi film) 
 Dulla Vaily (2019) Thanedaar Choudhary
 Solar Eclipse: Depth of Darkness (2019) -- Sardar Patel
 Rabb Da Radio 2 (2019) -- Maama Preetam Singh 
 Kaamyaab (2020)
 Gabru Gang (TBA) -- Mahendra Pratap Singh
 Yaar Jugaari (TBA) -- (TBA)

Television

References

External links
 

Living people
Male actors in Hindi cinema
Indian male television actors
20th-century Indian male actors
21st-century Indian male actors
Year of birth missing (living people)